Hristo Andonov (Bulgarian/) (1887–1928) was a Bulgarian revolutionary and a leader of the Internal Macedonian Revolutionary Organization (IMARO).

Biography
Hristo Andonov was born in the village of Grčište (now in Republic of North Macedonia). He joined the revolutionary organization IMARO, but because he was wanted by the Ottoman authorities, he escaped to Bulgaria. During the Balkan Wars, Andonov was a volunteer in the Macedonian-Adrianopolitan Volunteer Corps in the revolutionary band of Ichko Dimitrov. Later, he was a member of the revolutionary band of Kosta Hristov Popeto and he also served in the 4th company of the 15th Štip Division. At the end of the First World War, he participated in the restoration of the IMRO and joined a revolutionary band that operated in the region of Strumica. 1923 he became a leader in the region of Gevgelija, and in the years that followed, he became a leader of the region of Dojran.

Andonov was killed in 1928 near the village of Dimidovo, in the Petrich region, which was renamed Samuilovo in 1935.

References

1880s births
1928 deaths
People from Valandovo Municipality
Members of the Internal Macedonian Revolutionary Organization
Bulgarian revolutionaries
Bulgarian military personnel of the Balkan Wars
Bulgarian military personnel of World War I
Macedonian Bulgarians